Corina Cornella Johanna Cathari Luijks (born 20 November 1995) is a Dutch women's association footballer, who plays as a forward for Fatih Karagümrük S.K. in the Turkish Super League with jersey number 14.

Private life 
Born on 20 November 1995, Corina Luijks is a native of  Lepelstraat, Bergen op Zoom, Netherland.

Club career 
Corina Luijks played for the Belgian RSC Anderlecht in Anderlecht capping in three matches of the in the 2013–14 BeNe League season. The next season, she returned home to join  PSV Eindhoven. In the 2015–16 season, she again moved to Belgium, and was with Lierse SK. In the 2017–18 season, she was with her home country's Excelsior Rotterdam  in Rotterdam, where she scored two goals in 21 matches of the Eredivisie. In the 2018–19 season, she moved to Iyaly to play for the Bari-based club A.S.D. Pink Sport Time in the Serie B. She scored three goals in ten matches, and the next season, she appeared in eight games netting one goal. She then returned home, and signed with S.V. Zulte Waregem, where she appeared in six matches and netted two goals. In the 2021–2022 season, she went to Soyaux, France to play for the local club ASJ Soyaux, where she scored one goal in ten matches. In October 2022, Luijks moved to Turkey, and joined Fatih Karagümrük S.K. in Istanbyl to play in the 2022*23 Super League.

International career 
Luijks was selected to the Netherlands women's national futsal team in 2018.

References 

1995 births
Living people
People from Bergen op Zoom
Dutch women's footballers
Dutch women's futsal players
Women's association football forwards
Excelsior Rotterdam players
Eredivisie (women) players
Dutch expatriate footballers
Dutch expatriates in Belgium
Expatriate women's footballers in Belgium
BeNe League players
Dutch expatriates in Italy
Expatriate women's footballers in Italy
Dutch expatriates in France
Expatriate women's footballers in France
Division 1 Féminine players
ASJ Soyaux-Charente players
Dutch expatriate sportspeople in Turkey
Expatriate women's footballers in Turkey
Turkish Women's Football Super League players
Fatih Karagümrük S.K. (women's football) players